Guy I de la Roche (1205–1263) was the Duke of Athens (from 1225/34), the son and successor of the first duke Othon. After the conquest of Thebes, Othon gave half the city in lordship to Guy.

Life
Guy's early life is obscure. Since the 18th century, historians assumed Guy to have been a nephew of the first duke of Athens, Othon de la Roche, but a charter from 1251, published by J. Longnon in 1973, establishes him as Othon's son. It is unknown when he succeeded to the duchy: Othon is last mentioned in 1225, and was certainly dead by 1234. Again, earlier scholars, following J.A. Buchon and Karl Hopf, supposed that Othon returned to his native Burgundy after 1225, whereupon Guy inherited him in Greece; as J. Longnon pointed out, however, although possible, there is no evidence for it. Furthermore, the charter indicates that initially, Guy inherited the duchy and some lands in France, but not Othon's other Greek possession, the lordship of Argos and Nauplia in the Principality of Achaea, which passed to Guy's brother Othon, lord of Ray, who kept it until 1251, when Guy purchased it from him for 15,000 hyperpyra and in exchange for his own lands and claims in France.

Guy also owned the whole of Thebes, for which along with Argos he owed homage to the prince of Achaea. Athens itself was independent of any other sovereign than the Latin emperor after the fall of the Kingdom of Thessalonica in 1224. The duchy was prospering at the time, however, due to its silk industry (centred at Thebes) and its trade with Venice and Genoa. In 1240, Guy gave out half of the lordship of Thebes to Bela of St. Omer, the husband of his sister Bonne.

When Prince William II of Achaea disputed the suzerainty over the island of Euboea with the Venetians and the local triarchs, Guy supported the latter. In the spring of 1258, William marched on Thebes and defeated Guy in a hard-fought battle at the foot of Mount Karydi. He was subsequently besieged in Thebes and forced to surrender. He did homage at Nikli, but the barons of the realm, not being his peers, sent him for judgment to France. He left in the spring of 1259. The court of France found him not liable for liege homage and thus unable to be deprived of his fief. His journey was to be his punishment. The Chronicle of Morea asserts that Athens, which was technically only a lordship, was officially raised to the status of a duchy only after Guy met with King Louis IX of France sometime in 1260. In Spring that year, Guy set out to return to Greece, receiving news on the way that William II had been defeated by Emperor Michael VIII Palaeologus at the Battle of Pelagonia and taken prisoner. Soon after his arrival, news reached him of the fall of Constantinople to the Byzantines.

Guy also served as the administrator of Achaea while William II was held prisoner by Michale VIII.

Guy survived these serious ruptures to the Frankish states in Greece until his death in 1263 and was succeeded by his son John I.

Family 
Guy married an unknown woman from the de Bruyeres family and had the following children:
 John, Duke of Athens (died 1280), succeeded his father as duke in 1263, unmarried and childless
 William (died 1287), duke of Athens, married Helena Angelina Komnene, by whom he had one son, Guy II
 Alice (died 1282), regent of Beirut, married John II of Beirut 
 Marguerite (died after 1293), married Count Henry I of Vaudémont
 Isabella (died before 1291), married first Geoffrey of Briel, lord of Karytaina, and then Hugh of Brienne, count of Brienne and Lecce
 Catherine, married Carlo di Lagonessa, seneschal of Sicily

Notes

References
  
 

1205 births
1263 deaths
13th-century people from the Principality of Achaea
Christians of the Fourth Crusade
Dukes of Athens
De la Roche family
Lords of Argos and Nauplia
13th-century rulers in Europe
13th-century French people